If War Comes Tomorrow is a 1938 Soviet drama film directed by Lazar Antsi-Polovsky, Georgy Beryozko, Yefim Dzigan and Nikolai Karmazinsky.

Plot 
The film tells about the readiness of the Red Army to defend the Soviet Union in the event of an enemy attack.

Starring 
 Inna Fyodorova as commander's wife
 Vsevolod Sanayev as soldier (uncredited)
 Serafim Kozminsky as air brigade commander

References

External links 

1938 films
1930s Russian-language films
Soviet black-and-white films
Soviet drama films
1938 drama films